Igor Konstantinovich Kashintsev (17 June 1932 – 11 December 2015) was a Soviet and Russian film and theater actor. He was a People's Artist of Russia (2003) and was awarded the Order of Friendship (2008).

He was also known for his readings of the works of Chekhov, Averchenko and Zoshchenko in the Moscow State Philharmonic. He died in 2015, aged 83.

Selected filmography
 The July rain (1966)
 Wings (1966)
 The Golden Calf (1968)
 Investigation Held by ZnaToKi (1971)
 This Merry Planet (1973)
 The Flight of Mr. McKinley (1975)
 Pirates of the 20th Century (1979)
 Yeralash (1982)
 Time for rest from Saturday to Monday (1984)
 Dead Souls (1984)
 Battle of Moscow (1985)
 Frenzied Bus (1990)
 Trifles of Life (1992)
  Kiss Not for the Рress (2008)

References

External links 
 

1932 births
2015 deaths
Male actors from Moscow
Soviet male actors
Honored Artists of the RSFSR
People's Artists of Russia
Moscow Art Theatre School alumni